The Mississippi Valley and Western Railway (MV&W) was the name of three different shortline railroads which operated in the U.S. states of Iowa and Missouri. The first company was formed on January 25, 1871, and existed for just five days before merging with a much larger road (itself the product of the merger with three other railroads).  On January 20, 1873, two other railroads merged with the MV&W to create a second consolidated company. This last railroad went bankrupt on August 7, 1874, having constructed only a minimal amount of track. The bankrupt firm was sold to the St. Louis, Keokuk and North Western Railway.

History

Missouri railroad predecessors
On February 27, 1851, the state of Missouri issued a charter to the Canton and Bloomfield Railroad to build a rail line from Canton, Missouri, to Bloomfield, Iowa. There is no indication that any equipment was purchased.

On February 17, 1857, the state of Missouri issued a charter to the Mississippi and Missouri River Air Line Railroad, giving that railroad extensive privileges to build a rail line from the Mississippi to Missouri river in 10 northern counties of Missouri.

The Canton and Bloomfield Railroad was sold to the Mississippi and Missouri River Air Line on June 25, 1860. But work ceased when the United States government seized the railroad's equipment as part of the American Civil War effort. In 1868, the company obtained more right of way to the west, and in 1869 graded a track bed  to Glenwood, Missouri. The company also acquired a  right of way from Canton to West Quincy in 1868, and by early 1870 had graded this as well.  but no track was laid on either bed.

On February 18, 1865, the state of Missouri issued a charter to the Alexandria, Canton, La Grange and West Quincy Railroad, to build a line from Alexandria, Missouri, south through Canton and La Grange to West Quincy, Missouri. Although the company conducted surveys of its route, no other construction work was done. On April 1, 1870, this railroad merged with the Mississippi and Missouri River Air Line (effective April 8, 1870) to form the similarly named Mississippi and Missouri River Air-Line Railroad. The company contracted with the Missouri Railway Construction Company, which built  of standard gauge, single-line track from West Quincy to Canton. The Air-Line turned over nearly all of its bonds to the construction company in order to pay for this construction.

The first and second Mississippi Valley and Western Railways
On January 25, 1871, the Mississippi Valley and Western Railway was incorporated in the state of Iowa, with headquarters at Canton, Missouri. The charter permitted the railroad to build a line from Keokuk, Iowa, to the Iowa-Missouri border. The southern terminus of the line had to be within  of Alexandria, Missouri. There is no indication that it had any assets other than its charter.

Five days later, the MV&W was merged with the Mississippi and Missouri River Air-Line Railroad to form a new MV&W. This gave the consolidated railroad access to markets in both Missouri and Iowa. The merged firm was incorporated on March 10, 1871, and completed just under  of standard gauge, single-line track from Canton to Buena Vista, Iowa, by the end of 1872.

Third Mississippi Valley and Western Railway
Meanwhile, on January 15, 1870, the state of Missouri chartered the Clarksville and Western Railroad. It had the authority to build a rail line from Clarksville, Missouri, west to Bowling Green, Missouri, where it would meet with the Louisiana and Missouri River Railroad (whose line ran from Bowling Green to Louisiana, Missouri). By the end of 1872, it had graded some of this bed, and built or partially built several bridges on the line.

The state of Missouri next chartered the Mississippi Valley Railroad on May 24, 1871, giving it authority to run a line from Hannibal, Missouri, to Moody, Missouri. On August 8, 1872, the directors of the railroad declared their intention to continue the line from Hannibal south to Clarksville in order to connect with the Clarksville and Western. Little actual work was done, however. The company only completed a preliminary survey of its route, and obtained only a limited (and indeterminate) amount of right of way by late 1872.

On January 20, 1873, the Clarksville & Western and the Mississippi Valley consolidated with the MV&W to form a third company, also known as the MV&W. By 1874, the firm had constructed  of track from West Quincy to Hannibal. Its total completed track was just . Potentially, the railroad had the right to construct a  main and branch line from Quincy through Keokuk to Brownville, Nebraska.

Default and sale
Ohio railroad executive and investor Amasa Stone invested in the MV&W when it formed on January 20, 1873. The MV&W defaulted on its bonds, and on August 7, 1874, was turned over to a receiver—which turned out to be Amasa Stone. Stone put the railroad up for sale, and it was sold to his brother, Andros Stone, on April 14, 1875. Six days later, Andros Stone sold the railroad to the St. Louis, Keokuk and North Western Railway (SLK&NW), which had been formed by Andros Stone and others to acquire the assets of the bankrupt line. The sale closed June 22, 1875. Andros Stone received $165,000 ($ in  dollars) in cash, $600,000 ($ in  dollars) in bonds (with a maturity due in two years at 7 percent interest), and $471,800 ($ in  dollars) in common and preferred stock.

Court decisions
The bankruptcy of the MV&W lead to two important legal cases.

In Mississippi Valley and Western Railway Co. v. United States Express Co., a fast-freight firm, the United States Express Co., sued the railroad and its trustees seeking payment for services rendered. With the railroad bankrupt, it sought to reclaim these funds from the railroad's bondholders—who had received payment in the railroad's final months (while U.S. Express went unpaid). But the Supreme Court of Illinois denied the claim, noting that a lender was entitled to payment until a receiver was appointed. A receiver had no authority to seize payments made to the lender prior to the declaration of insolvency.

A second case, Barney v. Keokuk, was decided the same year by the Supreme Court of the United States. Several railroads, including the Mississippi Valley and Western Railway Company, laid track on this "reclaimed land". A local landowner, shut off from the river by this construction, sued, demanding removal of the railroad tracks, wharves, and warehouse erected between his land and the river. The Supreme Court noted that the public held title to the soil below the high-water mark on a river. Under the peculiarities of Iowa law, a city had the right to erect a street on reclaimed land erected on this publicly held riverbed. Iowa law gave railroads the right to run on the streets, and thus the tracks were permissible.

References
Notes

Citations

Bibliography

Lake Shore and Michigan Southern Railway lines
New York Central Railroad lines
Rail infrastructure in Michigan
Railway lines opened in 1852
Railway lines opened in 1867
Defunct Missouri railroads